Vaginula is a genus of air-breathing land slugs, terrestrial pulmonate gastropod mollusks in the family Veronicellidae, the leatherleaf slugs.

Distribution
These land slugs occur in:
 Cuba
 Seychelles (e.g. in Vallée De Mai on Lodoicea)

Species
Species within the genus Vaginula include:
 Vaginula cubensis
 Vaginula maculata
 Vaginula occidentalis
 Vaginula rodericensis
 Vaginula variegatula
 Vaginula seychellensis

References

Veronicellidae